Samuel Urzetta (March 19, 1926 – April 8, 2011) was an American professional golfer, best known for winning the 1950 U.S. Amateur.

Urzetta attended St. Bonaventure University where he captained the basketball team and led the nation in free-throw shooting percentage as a junior. He was inducted into the St. Bonaventure Athletics Hall of Fame in 1969.

In 1950, Urzetta won the U.S. Amateur over Frank Stranahan. The match went a record 39 holes (scheduled for 36), a record that still stands (although tied in 2000). He played on the U.S. Walker Cup team in 1951 and 1953.

Urzetta turned professional in 1954 and played on the PGA Tour and then became the head professional at the Country Club of Rochester from 1956 to 1993. He was elected to the Hall of Fame of the Western New York Section of the PGA of America in 1986.

Amateur wins
this list may be incomplete
1948 Monroe Invitational, New York State Amateur
1949 Monroe Invitational
1950 Monroe Invitational, U.S. Amateur

Professional wins
Western New York PGA (three times)

U.S. national team appearances
Amateur
Walker Cup: 1951 (winners), 1953 (winners)
Americas Cup: 1952 (winners)

References

American male golfers
PGA Tour golfers
Golfers from New York (state)
American men's basketball players
St. Bonaventure Bonnies men's basketball players
Sportspeople from Rochester, New York
1926 births
2011 deaths